Karel Nováček defeated Magnus Gustafsson in the final, 6–3, 6–3, 5–7, 0–6, 6–1 to win the singles tennis title at the 1991 Hamburg European Open.

Juan Aguilera was the defending champion, but lost in the first round to Jordi Arrese.

Seeds

Draw

Finals

Top half

Section 1

Section 2

Bottom half

Section 3

Section 4

References

Singles